Leonardo León (born 1952) is a Chilean historian known for his work the Mapuche world, history of the frontier and more recently by the study of the lower classes during the Chilean War of Independence.

References

20th-century Chilean historians
20th-century Chilean male writers
21st-century Chilean historians
21st-century Chilean male writers
Historians of the Captaincy General of Chile
1952 births
Living people
Academic staff of the University of Chile
Academic staff of the University of Valparaíso
People convicted of child sexual abuse